Regional Committees of the Communist Party of the Soviet Union were regional branches of the Communist Party of the Soviet Union which usually encompassed a region, oblast, krai, or Autonomous Soviet Socialist Republic. Regional Committees were elected by their Regional Conferences. Until June 1990, the Russian Soviet Federative Socialist Republic was the only union republic where the Regional Committees were responsible directly to the Communist Party of the Soviet Union instead of their respective republican branch of the Communist Party of the Soviet Union. Similarly, cities had City Committees of the Communist Party of the Soviet Union.

History 
In 1919, the previous committees of the Russian Communist Party (Bolsheviks) were replaced by provincial organizations of the Russian Communist Party (Bolsheviks), during the reform of the administrative-territorial division. Provincial organizations were reorganized into regional committees.

Organization 
Each regional committee was responsible to the Central Committee of the Communist Party of their republic. In the case of the Russian Soviet Federative Socialist Republic, every regional committee within the RSFSR was directly responsible to the Central Committee of the Communist Party of the Soviet Union. The First Secretary was the highest official within a regional committee and was elected by their regional committee. The Charter of the Communist Party of the Soviet Union from 1972 states how regional committees and republican branches of the Communist Party of the Soviet Union are to be managed.Governing bodies of republican, regional and regional organizations of the party

43. The supreme body of a regional, provincial, republican party organization is the regional, provincial party conference or congress of the Communist Party of the Union Republic, and in the interval between them - the regional committee, regional committee, and the Central Committee of the Communist Party of the Union Republic.

45. Regional, regional committees, and the Central Committee of the Communist Parties of the Union Republics elect bureaus, including committee secretaries. Party secretaries must be at least five years old. Chairmen of party commissions, heads of departments of these committees, editors of party newspapers and magazines are also approved at plenary committees. Secretariats may be created to consider current issues and verify compliance with the regional, party, and regional committees of the Communist Parties of the Union republics.

46. The plenary session of the regional, regional committee, and the Central Committee of the Communist Party of the Union Republic is convened at least once every four months.

List of Regional Committees 
This is a list of Regional Committees of the Communist Party of the Soviet Union in August 1991.

Russian Soviet Federative Socialist Republic - Communist Party of the Russian SFSR 
Regional Committees of Oblasts

Regional Committees of Autonomous Oblasts

Regional Committees of Krais

Regional Committees of Autonomous Soviet Socialist Republics

Azerbaijan Soviet Socialist Republic - Communist Party of the Azerbaijan SSR

Byelorussian Soviet Socialist Republic - Communist Party of the Byelorussian SSR

Georgian Soviet Socialist Republic - Communist Party of the Georgian SSR

Kazakh Soviet Socialist Republic - Communist Party of the Kazakh SSR

Kirghiz Soviet Socialist Republic - Communist Party of the Kirghiz SSR

Tajik Soviet Socialist Republic - Communist Party of the Tajik SSR

Turkmen Soviet Socialist Republic - Communist Party of the Turkmen SSR

Ukrainian Soviet Socialist Republic - Communist Party of the Ukrainian SSR

Uzbek Soviet Socialist Republic - Communist Party of the Uzbek SSR

See also 

 Communist Party of the Soviet Union
 Oblast
 Autonomous Soviet Socialist Republic
 Chinese Communist Party Provincial Standing Committee

References 

 
Communist Party of the Soviet Union
1919 establishments in Russia
1991 disestablishments in the Soviet Union